The Kii-class battleship was a planned class of four fast battleships to be built for the Imperial Japanese Navy (IJN) during the 1920s. Only two of the ships received names. They were intended to reinforce Japan's "eight-eight fleet" of eight battleships and eight battlecruisers after the United States announced a major naval construction program in 1919. However, after the signing of the Washington Naval Treaty in 1922, work on the ships was suspended; one pair was cancelled in November 1923 and the other in April 1924.

Design and background

By 1918, the Navy had gained approval for an "eight-six" fleet of eight battleships and six battlecruisers, all ships under eight years old. Despite this, the IJN gained approval of the "eight-eight-eight" plan in 1920 after American President Woodrow Wilson announced plans in 1919 to re-initiate the 1916 plan for ten additional battleships and six battlecruisers. The Japanese response was to plan the construction of eight additional fast battleships in the Kii and the Number 13 classes.

Designed by Captain Yuzuru Hiraga, the Kii class was based largely on the preceding s, which were in turn based on a less-armored Tosa-class design. The only major difference between the Kiis and Amagis was their speed and armor—the Amagis were faster, and the Kiis had a thicker belt. Despite this lineage, the Kiis were classified as "fast battleships" by the Japanese, as they had decided to end the distinction between "battleship" and "battlecruiser."

Description

The class was intended to be equipped with four Gijutsu-Hombu geared steam turbines, each of which drove one propeller shaft.

The primary armament of the Kii class was ten 45-caliber  guns in five twin-gun turrets, two fore and three aft of the superstructure. The secondary battery consisted of 16 single 50-caliber  guns was mounted in casemates in the superstructure. The ships' anti-aircraft defenses consisted of four single 45-caliber  10th Year Type anti-aircraft guns mounted around the single funnel. Each of these guns had a maximum elevation of +75° and a maximum rate of fire of 10–11 rounds per minute.

The decks would have been 120 mm thick.

Construction
Two ships were ordered on 12 October 1921, and two more were ordered later that year. Kii was allocated to Kure Naval Arsenal, Kure, with a projected completion date of November 1923, and Owari (an ancient province) was allocated to the Yokosuka Naval Arsenal, Yokosuka, with completion in September. Two more unnamed ships, Numbers 11 and 12, were assigned to Kawasaki in Kobe and Mitsubishi in Nagasaki, respectively. Numbers 11 and 12 were formally canceled on 19 November 1923; Kii and Owari followed on 14 April 1924.

Footnotes

References

External links

 World Battleships List: Japanese Dreadnoughts

Battleship classes
Battleships of the Imperial Japanese Navy
Proposed ships
Abandoned military projects of Japan